Hydropunctaria alaskana is a species of crustose lichen in the family Verrucariaceae. Found in Alaska, it was described as a new species in 2020 by Holger Thüs and Sergio Pérez-Ortega. The type specimen was collected from the Hoonah-Angoon Census Area in Glacier Bay National Park, where it was found growing on metamorphic rocks beside a creek. Buellia coniops and Verrucaria aethiobola were other lichens on the same rock. Hydropunctaria alaskana is also known to occur on Mitkof Island in Alaska, and on Vancouver Island in British Columbia.

References

Verrucariales
Lichen species
Lichens described in 2020
Lichens of Western Canada
Lichens of Subarctic America
Fungi without expected TNC conservation status